Conway Zirkle (October 28, 1895 – March 28, 1972) was an American botanist and historian of science.

Zirkle was professor emeritus at the University of Pennsylvania. He was highly critical of Lamarckism, Lysenkoism and Marxian biology.

Selected publications

Books
 The Beginnings of Plant Hybridization (1935)
 Death of a Science in Russia, the Fate of Genetics as Described in "Pravda" and Elsewhere (1949)
 Evolution, Marxian Biology, and the Social Scene (1959)
 The Evolution of Biology (1964)

Papers
 1935. The Inheritance of Acquired Characters and the Provisional Hypothesis of Pangenesis. American Naturalist 69: 417–445.
 1936. Further Notes on Pangenesis and the Inheritance of Acquired Characters.  American Naturalist 70: 529–546.
 1941. Natural Selection Before the 'Origin of Species'''.  Proceedings of the American Philosophical Association 84: 71–123.
 1946. The Early History of the Idea of the Inheritance of Acquired Characters and Pangenesis. Transactions of the American Philosophical Society. 335: 91–151.
 1947. The Theory of Concentric Spheres: Edmund Halley, Cotton Mather, & John Cleves Symmes. Isis. University of Chicago Press (on behalf of The History of Science Society) 37: 155–159. 
 1952. Early Ideas on Inbreeding and Crossbreeding. In Heterosis, edited by John W. Gowen, 1–13. Iowa State College Press.
 1958. The First Recognized Plant Hybrid. Journal of Heredity 49: 137–138.
 1959. Species Before Darwin. Proceedings of the American Philosophical Society 103: 636–644.
 1964. Some Oddities in the Delayed Discovery of Mendelism. Journal of Heredity'' 55 (2): 65–72.

References

External links
 

1895 births
1972 deaths
American botanists
Critics of Lamarckism
University of Pennsylvania faculty